The York, Hull and East and West Yorkshire Junction Railway was a proposed railway line, promoted in the mid 1840s, intended to connect York to the East Riding of Yorkshire, England.

The line was not built, instead an alternative proposal, the  York and North Midland Railway's York to Beverley Line gained parliamentary approval in 1846, and was opened in two sections in 1847 and 1865.

History
The railway line, proposed during the Railway Mania, planned to connect to the proposed Leeds and York Railway at York, and serve destinations in the eastern Vale of York and East Riding of Yorkshire. From York the line was to run east to Pocklington, Market Weighton, and Beverley, then by the east side of the River Hull via Weel and Stoneferry south to the new East Docks (Victoria Dock) in Kingston upon Hull. Branches from the line were planned to Selby via Holme upon Spalding Moor from Market Weighton; to Driffield from Holme upon Spalding Moor via a crossing of the Yorkshire Wolds in the vicinity of Nunburnholme and Warter; and a branch to Hornsea running eastwards from a junction off the main line near Weel.

The York, Hull and East and West Yorkshire Junction Railway Company was provisionally registered in 1845, and the line, together with the Leeds and York Railway was supported by the Manchester and Leeds Railway.

The route invaded an area which at that time was exclusively served by the York and North Midland Railway (Y&NMR), and passed through an area which had already been surveyed for a railway by the Y&NMR. In an attempt to preserve its monopoly, in 1845, the Y&NMR began proceedings for bills before parliament for equivalent lines between York, Market Weighton and Beverley; Market Weighton and Selby; Market Weighton and Driffield (as a line from junctions at Goodmanham and Cranswick); and to Hornsea from a junction at Leconfield; The York and Hull company also initiated its bill in 1845, with the line from York to Hull, and its branches to Hornsea, Driffield and Selby.

The Manchester and Leeds company were persuaded to withdraw their support from the rival scheme in exchange for an agreement to make them joint lessors of the Hull and Selby Railway. The Y&NMR's parliamentary proposals were successful, resulting in the ''York and North Midland Rly. (East Riding Branches) [No.1] Act of 1846, which enabled the construction of line from York to Beverley, opened to Market Weighton in 1847, the remainder being completed in 1865. A second act in 1846 enabled the construction of the Selby to Market Weighton Line.

Notes

References

Sources

External links

Abandoned rail transport projects in the United Kingdom
Rail transport in the East Riding of Yorkshire